The 2009 NCAA Division I women's soccer tournament (also known as the 2009 Women's College Cup) was the 28th annual single-elimination tournament to determine the national champion of NCAA Division I women's collegiate soccer. The semifinals and championship game were played at the Aggie Soccer Complex in College Station, Texas from December 4–6, 2009 while the preceding rounds were played at various sites across the country from November 12–28.

North Carolina defeated Stanford in the final, 1–0, to win their twentieth national title. The Tar Heels (23–3–1) were coached by Anson Dorrance.

The most outstanding offensive player (for the second consecutive year) was Casey Nogueira from North Carolina, and the most outstanding defensive player was Whitney Engen, also from North Carolina. Nogueira and Engen, alongside nine other players, were named to the All-Tournament team.

The tournament's leading scorer was Sydney Leroux from UCLA, with 8 goals.

Qualification

All Division I women's soccer programs were eligible to qualify for the tournament. The tournament field remained fixed at 64 teams.

Format
Just as before, the final two rounds, deemed the Women's College Cup, were played at a pre-determined neutral site. All other rounds were played on campus sites at the home field of the higher-seeded team. The only exceptions were the first two rounds, which were played at regional campus sites. The top sixteen teams hosted four team-regionals on their home fields (with some exceptions, noted below) during the tournament's first weekend.

National seeds

Teams

Bracket

Stanford Bracket

UCLA Bracket

North Carolina Bracket

Florida State Bracket

College Cup

All-tournament team
Casey Nogueira, North Carolina (most outstanding offensive player)
Whitney Engen, North Carolina (most outstanding defensive player)
Ashlyn Harris, North Carolina
Tobin Heath, North Carolina
Rachel Givan, North Carolina
Jessica McDonald, North Carolina
Lauren Cheney, UCLA
Sydney Leroux, UCLA
Kelley O'Hara, Stanford
Christen Press, Stanford
Lauren Fowlkes, Notre Dame

See also 
 NCAA Women's Soccer Championships (Division II, Division III)
 NCAA Men's Soccer Championships (Division I, Division II, Division III)

References

NCAA
NCAA Women's Soccer Championship
NCAA Division I Women's Soccer Tournament
NCAA Division I Women's Soccer Tournament
NCAA Division I Women's Soccer Tournament